Anguita is a municipality in the province of Guadalajara, Castile-La Mancha, Spain, with a population of 203 in 2009.

Geography

Anguita is located in the Sistema Ibérico below Sierra Ministra. River Tajuña and its tributaries, La Madre and Prado Creek flow through the area.

The municipality includes the towns of Aguilar de Anguita, Anguita, Padilla del Ducado, Santa María del Espino and  Villarejo de Medina.

There is an important population of Dupont's lark (Chersophilus duponti) in the surrounding area.

History
Anguita's area has been populated since ancient times. Anguita has remains of a Roman camp, although it is possible that it has been a Celtiberian city before.

During the al-Andalus period, Anguita was located on the frontier with the northern Christian-held territory.

In 1813 the first Diputation of Spain was signed here.

Main sights
Cigüeña Tower.
Remains of the Roman camp
Castro del Hocincavero and some others ruins, such as those of Aguilar de Anguita, where is the biggest necropolis of this culture, "El Altillo".
Saint Peter Church, a Romanesque-Gothic church.
''Virgen de la Lastra hermitage, the biggest church in the village.
La Soledad hermitage, a typical local hermitage.

References

External links

 
Situation
Information of the village from "Castilla-La Mancha: descubre y siente"

Municipalities in the Province of Guadalajara